Kyomaru Dam  is a gravity dam located in Hiroshima Prefecture in Japan. The dam is used for irrigation. The catchment area of the dam is 3.3 km2. The dam impounds about 10  ha of land when full and can store 499 thousand cubic meters of water. The construction of the dam was started on 1977 and completed in 1996.

References

Dams in Hiroshima Prefecture